Aisha Duo is an Italian jazz duo consisting of Andrea Dulbecco on vibraphone and Luca Gusella on marimba. They began working together while in the same percussion class at the Conservatory of Milan..The term "aisha" is an Arabic female name meaning "alive". 

Two of the band's songs, "Amanda" and "Despertar", are loaded by default onto any computer with an installation of Microsoft's Windows Vista operating system. 

Marco Decimo and Glen Velez appeared on Aisha Duo's album Quiet Songs.

Discography
 Quiet Songs (ObliqSound, 2005)

References

External links
Aisha Duo home page 
Aisha Duo - Discogs

Italian electronic music groups
Living people
Musical groups from Milan
Year of birth missing (living people)